Nalibaki is an agrotown in Minsk Region, in western Belarus.

History
During the times of the Polish–Lithuanian Commonwealth, since 1555 the settlement belonged to the family of the Radziwiłł magnates. Eventually it has grown into a miasteczko. Since 1722 it was the home of a glass factory founded by Anna Radziwiłł, closed in 1862.

After the Second Partition of Poland, since 1793 it belonged to the Russian Empire. In 1896 it was part of  Vilna Governorate, Russian Empire.

In 1919 a battle of the Polish-Soviet war occurred nearby. 

Following the 1939 Soviet invasion of Poland, it was annexed to Byelorussian SSR of the Soviet Union. During World War II, the Jewish population of Nalibaki was massacred by the Germans, with some escaping and joining the Soviet partisans, while 129 Poles were massacred by Soviet partisans on May 9, 1943 (see the Nalibaki massacre).

On August 6, 1943, Naliboki was pacified again, this time by German troops, as part of the so-called 'Operation Hermann', and its inhabitants were deported deep into the Reich for forced labor.

See also
Naliboki forest

References

Further reading 
 Верхняе Панямонне: альманах лакальнай гісторыі, Вып. 1, Мінск 2012.

External links
Radzima.org: Catholic Church of the Assumption of the Blessed Virgin Mary
 IPN investigation: "Omówienie dotychczasowych ustaleń w śledztwach w sprawach o zbrodnie"
 Remembering Naliboki: "Dorastanie pod dwiema okupacjami: Naliboki"

Villages in Belarus
Populated places in Minsk Region
Stowbtsy District
Minsk Voivodeship
Oshmyansky Uyezd
Nowogródek Voivodeship (1919–1939)
Holocaust locations in Poland